John Anthony Copeland (born September 20, 1970) is a former American college and professional football player who was a defensive end in the National Football League (NFL) for eight seasons.  He played college football for the University of Alabama, was recognized as an All-American and was a member of a national championship team in 1992.  He was drafted by the Cincinnati Bengals in the first round of the 1993 NFL Draft, and he played his entire pro career for the Bengals.

Early years
Copeland was born in Lanett, Alabama.  He attended Valley High School in Valley, Alabama, where he played high school football for the Valley Rams.

College career
Copeland initially attended Hinds Community College in Raymond, Mississippi, but later received an athletic scholarship to transfer to the University of Alabama, and played for coach Gene Stallings' Alabama Crimson Tide football teams.  Paired with fellow defensive end Eric Curry on opposite ends of the Crimson Tide's defensive line, the two ends were key contributors to the team's No. 1 ranked defense in 1992, when both of Curry and Copeland were recognized as consensus first-team All-Americans.  As a senior, he was a member of the Crimson Tide team that won the consensus national championship by defeating the Miami Hurricanes 34–13 in the Sugar Bowl.

Professional career
In eight NFL seasons, he played in 107 regular season games, started 102 of them, and compiled 324 tackles, 24.0 quarterback sacks, nine forced fumbles, three interceptions and a touchdown on a fumble recovery .

NFL statistics

Coaching
He was the Head Coach and off-season strength and conditioning coach for the Tuscaloosa Academy Knights in Tuscaloosa, Alabama but was relieved of his duties on July 29, 2020.

References

1970 births
Living people
People from Lanett, Alabama
Alabama Crimson Tide football players
All-American college football players
American football defensive ends
American football defensive tackles
American strength and conditioning coaches
Cincinnati Bengals players
Hinds Eagles football players